Tanya Kappo is an indigenous rights activist. She is one of the co-founders of Idle No More and was briefly the manager of community relations for Canada's national public inquiry into missing and murdered Indigenous women and girls.

Early life and education 
Kappo is from the Sturgeon Lake Cree Nation in Treaty 8 Territory and was raised on the Northwestern Alberta Reserve in Sturgeon Lake. Her father was Harold Cardinal, author of The Red Paper. She graduated the University of Manitoba with a J.D. in 2012.

Career 
Kappo co-founded the Idle No More movement in November 2012. Kappo described the impetus for founding the movement as "the legislation facing First Nations, primarily Bill C-45". Kappo co-edited the book The Winter We Danced: Voices From the Past, the Future, and the Idle No More Movement.

Kappo was hired as the community relations for the national public inquiry into missing and murdered Indigenous women and girls in early 2017. She resigned from the inquiry in June 2017. In November, 2017, Kappo emceed the symposium, Indigenous Climate Action: An Indigenous led climate change initiative. She currently works as a lawyer in Alberta.

Politics 
In 2006, Kappo ran for the Liberal Party of Canada in the federal election in the riding of Peace River (Alberta). She lost to Conservative candidate Chris Warkentin.

Personal life 
Kappo has three children and lives in Edmonton.

References 

Canadian people of Cree descent
Idle No More
First Nations women
21st-century Canadian lawyers
20th-century Canadian lawyers
Canadian women lawyers
Lawyers in Alberta
University of Manitoba alumni
Living people
Date of birth missing (living people)
20th-century women lawyers
21st-century women lawyers
Year of birth missing (living people)
20th-century Canadian women politicians
Liberal Party of Canada candidates for the Canadian House of Commons
Missing and Murdered Indigenous Women and Girls movement